On The Road Again is the third album by D. J. Rogers

Reception

Released in 1976. This would be D. J. Rogers second album with RCA Records.

Track listing
All songs written by D. J. Rogers; except where indicated.

"On the Road Again" - 3:27		
"One More Day" - 4:14		
"Love Can Be Found" - 2:58 		
"Let My Life Shine, Part I" - 2:09
"Ler My Life Shine, Part II" - 4:10	
"Secret Lady" (D. J. Rogers, Lonnie Simmons) - 3:33		
"Holding on to Love" (D. J. Rogers, Lonnie Simmons) - 2:57		
"Girl I Love You" - 3:53 		
"Only While It Lasts" - 3:36 		
"Say You Love Me One More Time" - 2:19

Personnel
D. J. Rogers - Fender Rhodes, Wurlitzer electric piano, clavinet, grand piano, lead and backing vocals
Harvey Mason, Jeff Porcaro, Paul Mabry, Richard Calhoun - drums
James Macon, Marlo Henderson, Michael McGloiry - guitar
Charles Wilson, Michael Wycoff - organ, backing vocals
Jerry Peters - piano
Kenneth Lupper - organ
Keith Hatchell - bass
Bob Farrell - electric piano
George Bohanon - trombone, soloist
The Gap Band, Al Deville, Carlos Garnett, David Majal Li  - horns
Denise Alexander, Emory Jones, Helena Dixon, New Experience, Rosalind Cash, Rudy Taylor, Steven Hunt - backing vocals

Charts

Singles

External links
 D. J. Rogers-On The Road Again at Discogs

References

1976 albums
D. J. Rogers albums
RCA Records albums